Daniele Sciaudone (born 10 August 1988) is an Italian footballer who plays as a central midfielder for  club Reggiana.

Club career
Born in Bergamo, Sciaudone finished his youth formation with local Tritium, making his senior debuts with the side in Serie D. In 2007, he joined Taranto in Serie C1.

In August 2009 Sciaudone joined fellow third-divisioner Foligno. After two years as a starter he returned to Foligno, playing a key part for the side who finished second but was relegated, however.

On 4 July 2012 Sciaudone moved to Serie B side Bari. On 25 August he made his division debut, coming on as a second-half substitute in a 2–1 home success over Cittadella; he scored his first goal came on 27 October, netting his side's only in a 1–1 draw at Padova.

Salernitana
On 6 August 2015 he was signed by Salernitana in a 3-year contract.

Spezia
On 30 January 2016 Sciaudone left for Spezia on loan, with an option to purchase. He picked no.7 shirt from departing Miguel de las Cuevas.

Novara
On 31 August 2017, Sciaudone was sold to Novara, with Francesco Bolzoni moved to opposite direction.

Loan to Cosenza
On 26 January 2019, he joined Cosenza on loan until the end of the 2018–19 season.

Cosenza
On 23 July 2019, he moved to Cosenza on a permanent basis, signing a 2-year contract.

Reggiana
On 26 August 2021, he signed a two-year contract with Reggiana.

Career statistics

References

External links

 AIC profile (data by football.it)  

1988 births
Living people
Footballers from Bergamo
Association football midfielders
Italian footballers
Serie B players
Serie C players
Taranto F.C. 1927 players
A.S.D. Città di Foligno 1928 players
S.S.C. Bari players
Catania S.S.D. players
U.S. Salernitana 1919 players
Novara F.C. players
Cosenza Calcio players
A.C. Reggiana 1919 players